Delias singhapura is a butterfly in the family Pieridae.It was described by Alfred Russel Wallace in 1867. It is found in  the Indomalayan realm.

Subspecies
Delias singhapura singhapura (Singapore, southern Malaysia, southern Peninsular Thailand)
Delias singhapura acuta Rothschild, 1915 (Sumatra)
Delias singhapura indistincta Fruhstorfer, 1897 (Borneo)
Delias singhapura simeuluensis Kotaki, 1992 (Simeulue)
Delias singhapura tsukadai Nakano, 1993 (Banyak)
Delias singhapura yusukei Nakano, 1988 (Palawan)

References

External links
Delias at Markku Savela's Lepidoptera and Some Other Life Forms

singhapura
Butterflies described in 1867
Butterflies of Asia
Taxa named by Alfred Russel Wallace